Clinidium planum is a species of ground beetle in the subfamily Rhysodinae. It was described by Louis Alexandre Auguste Chevrolat in 1844. It is probably endemic to Guadeloupe (Lesser Antilles); a female supposedly from "Mexico" probably represents another species and may have been mislabeled. Clinidium planum measure  in length.

References

Clinidium
Beetles of North America
Insects of Guadeloupe
Endemic fauna of Guadeloupe
Beetles described in 1844
Taxa named by Louis Alexandre Auguste Chevrolat